Yoon Jae-Young (born February 5, 1983) is a South Korean table tennis player. He won a bronze medal with the South Korean men's team at the 2008 Summer Olympics.

External links 
 Athlete bio at 2008 Olympics site

1983 births
Living people
South Korean male table tennis players
Table tennis players at the 2008 Summer Olympics
Olympic table tennis players of South Korea
Olympic bronze medalists for South Korea
Olympic medalists in table tennis
Medalists at the 2008 Summer Olympics
Table tennis players at the 2006 Asian Games
Asian Games medalists in table tennis

Asian Games silver medalists for South Korea
Medalists at the 2006 Asian Games